Ukrainian Government Building (romanized: Budynok Uriadu) is located in center of Kyiv at Hrushevsky Street in the vicinity of Verkhovna Rada building. It serves as the administrative building for the Cabinet of Ministers of Ukraine. From 1941 to 1954 the building was the tallest building in city.

Description
Structure was built in 1936-1938 based on design of architect Ivan Fomin and partially - architect Pavel Abrosimov. The main half-circled facade of the building is opened towards Hrushevskyi Street. The lower stories of the building are faced with big uncut blocks of a Tulchyn labradorite, while socle and portals with a polished granite. Alloy metal flagpoles and decorated gates were made in 1947.

Current location
The building was first designed on the demand of the People's Commissariat of Internal Affairs (NKVD), while the government was supposed to be located in the building that today is occupied by the Ministry of Foreign Affairs of Ukraine at Mykhailiv Square. However, construction plans were changed and refused for the building to be located in "High City" district (see Old Kyiv). Decision to change location has been made because the Government Building together with National Bank of Ukraine and Cabinet of Ministers Club headquarters compose a shared court with access to Anti-Air Defense safety bunker. Rumors also mention that use of the tunnels may lead to from the Verkhovna Rada building and the building of President's Secretariat. Therefore, all these institutions compactly moved to Lypky district not accidentally.

Previous locations
 Derzhprom Complex
 Kharkiv Arts Museum

References

External links
  Kyiv. The encyclopedic handbook.
  Official website of the government of Ukraine

Buildings and structures in Kyiv
Government buildings in Ukraine
Government buildings completed in 1938
Pecherskyi District
Hrushevsky Street (Kyiv)